Rüdiger Müller (born 13 February 1955) is a German fencer. He competed in the individual and team sabre events for East Germany at the 1980 Summer Olympics.

References

External links
 

1955 births
Living people
People from Nordsachsen
People from Bezirk Leipzig
German male fencers
Sportspeople from Saxony
Olympic fencers of East Germany
Fencers at the 1980 Summer Olympics